Virbia ostenta, the showy holomelina, is a moth in the family Erebidae. It was described by Henry Edwards in 1881. It is found in the mountain ranges of New Mexico, Arizona and Mexico.

The length of the forewings is about 17.1 mm for males and 18.5 mm for females. The male forewings are clay colored with a thin light salmon band. The hindwings are dark brownish olive, with a geranium-pink pattern. The female forewings are antique brown with a peach-red band. The hindwings are fuscous with a geranium-pink pattern.

Larvae have been reared on dandelion species and Lactuca floridana.

References

External links
 Original description: Edwards, Henry (1881). "Descriptions of Two New Species of Lithosidae". Papilio. 1 (1): 12.

Moths described in 1881
ostenta